The 1997 Maple Leaf Foods Canadian Junior Curling Championships were held February 8-16 in Selkirk, Manitoba.

Men's

Teams

Standings

Results

Draw 1

Draw 2

Draw 3

Draw 4

Draw 5

Draw 6

Draw 7

Draw 8

Draw 9

Draw 10

Draw 11

Draw 12

Draw 13

Draw 14

Draw 15

Draw 16

Draw 17

Draw 18

Draw 19

Draw 20

Tiebreakers

Tiebreaker #1

Tiebreaker #2

Tiebreaker #3

Playoffs

Semifinal

Final

Women's

Teams

Standings

Results

Draw 1

Draw 2

Draw 3

Draw 4

Draw 5

Draw 6

Draw 7

Draw 8

Draw 9

Draw 10

Draw 11

Draw 12

Draw 13

Draw 14

Draw 15

Draw 16

Draw 17

Draw 18

Draw 19

Draw 20

Playoffs

Tiebreaker

Semifinal

Final

Qualification

Ontario
The Ontario Junior Curling Championships were held in Owen Sound, with the finals on January 19. 

Sara Garland of Unionville won the women's event over Cannington's Denna Schell in the final, 12-1. In the men's final, John Morris of the Ottawa Curling Club defeated Greg Balsdon of St. Catharines 9-5.

References

External links
Men's statistics
Women's statistics

Canadian Junior Curling Championships
Curling in Manitoba
Sport in Selkirk, Manitoba
Canadian Junior Curling Championships
Canadian Junior Curling Championship
Canadian Junior Curling Championship